is a Japanese actor who is represented by the talent agency, Central Group, then Horipro.

Filmography

TV series

Films

Theatre
Live Spectacle Naruto 2015 (as Gaara)
Hyper Projection Engeki: Haikyu!! (as Shoyo Hinata) (2015 — 2018)
Poupelle of Chimney Town (2020)

Japanese dubbing
Finding Nemo (2003), Tad

References

External links
 Official profile 
  

Japanese male child actors
Japanese male stage actors
1994 births
Living people
People from Edogawa, Tokyo
Horikoshi High School alumni